Novosibirsk Infectious Diseases Hospital No. 1 is a hospital in Tsentralny District of Novosibirsk, Russia. It was founded in 1904.

History
In the late 19th century, large inflows of migrants to Novonikolayevsky Settlement (now Novosibirsk) gave rise to cases of infectious diseases, such as typhus, dysentery, cholera.

In 1904 (or 1906), the Infectious Diseases Hospital was established. It opened in rented premises on Yadrintsevskaya Street.

In 1912, a new hospital was constructed at 40 place (now block No. 1).

COVID-19
Since 2020, the hospital began to accept COVID-19 patients.

See also
 Novosibirsk City Clinical Hospital No. 1

References

Hospitals in Novosibirsk
Hospitals established in 1904